Jorunna parva, commonly known as the sea bunny, is a species of dorid nudibranch, a shell-less marine gastropod mollusc in the family Discodorididae. The species was first described by Kikutaro Baba. Its resemblance to a rabbit facilitated a surge in popularity on Twitter throughout Japan in 2015.

Description
The species is about 1 cm long on average. Its black-and-white rhinophores somewhat resemble a rabbit's ears. Its external gills are located near its rear. Its body is covered in papillae, fleshy protuberances used for sensory functions, giving it the appearance of a furry animal. There are multiple colorations of Jorunna parva, including yellow, white, and green, though the latter is rarely photographed. All of these variants have black papillae interspersed among papillae of their main color. There is controversy over whether or not the different colorations are divergent species.

Like most other members of its genus, Jorunna parva's diet consists of sponges in the family Chalinidae. These sponges contain toxins that can be used for cancer treatments.

Jorunna parva are hermaphrodites, meaning they produce both sperm and egg cells. They cannot fertilize the eggs themselves.

Distribution
This species was described from Kii Province, Japan. Jorunna parva has subsequently been reported from the Philippines, Tanzania, Papua New Guinea, Seychelles and Réunion but there are some doubts as to whether it is really a species complex. The Jorunna parva are concentrated in areas where there is an abundance of food and where resources are easily acquired. They often cling to submerged vegetation and spend majority of the time at the bottom of tropical waters.

References

 Camacho-García Y.E. & Gosliner T.M. (2008). Systematic revision of Jorunna Bergh, 1876 (Nudibranchia: Discodorididae) with a morphological phylogenetic analysis. Journal of Molluscan Studies 74: 143–181

Discodorididae
Gastropods described in 1938